Pavol Polievka (born 6 January 1969) is a Slovak former cyclist.

Major results
2008
 3rd Tour of Libya
2009
 2nd Time trial, National Road Championships
2010
 2nd Time trial, National Road Championships
 3rd Grand Prix Hydraulika Mikolasek
2011
 1st  Time trial, National Road Championships
2012
 3rd Overall Grand Prix Chantal Biya
1st Stage 4

References

External links

1969 births
Living people
Slovak male cyclists